Federico Costa (born 8 October 1988) is an Argentine professional footballer who plays as a goalkeeper.

Career
Costa started his career with local clubs Recreativo Estrellas and Estudiantes. In 2010, Costa joined Talleres of Torneo Argentino A. He didn't appear in a Talleres first-team squad until he was an unused substitute for two Copa Argentina matches in late-2012. It was in the Copa Argentina that Costa made his debut for the club, he played the full ninety minutes of a 3–0 victory over Sarmiento on 16 April 2014. He made his professional league debut a month later during a defeat to Independiente Rivadavia in Primera B Nacional. Three further appearances followed in 2013–14 which ended with relegation to Torneo Federal A.

He subsequently made twenty-two appearances in two seasons in Torneo Federal A, prior to departing Talleres at the conclusion of 2015 to join Argentine Primera División side Patronato. He made his top-flight debut on 9 September 2016 versus Gimnasia y Esgrima. In 2021, Costa played for Ferro Carril Oeste.

Career statistics
.

Honours
Talleres
Torneo Federal A: 2015

References

External links

1988 births
Living people
People from Río Cuarto, Córdoba
Argentine footballers
Association football goalkeepers
Torneo Argentino A players
Primera Nacional players
Torneo Federal A players
Argentine Primera División players
Estudiantes de Río Cuarto footballers
Talleres de Córdoba footballers
Club Atlético Patronato footballers
Ferro Carril Oeste footballers
Sportspeople from Córdoba Province, Argentina